The 2023 Turkish Women's Cup was the seventh edition of the Turkish Women's Cup, the annual women's football tournament held in Alanya, Turkey for the women's national association football teams. The tournament took place from 15 to 21 February 2023. Kosovo and Slovenia were crowned champions of the tournament after finishing unbeaten in three games.

Participating teams
Twelve football associations from four confederations (namely UEFA, CONMEBOL, CAF and AFC) confirmed their participation in the tournament. On 10 February 2023, the Venezuelan Football Federation announced that Venezuela wouldn't attend the tournament due to the 2023 Turkey–Syria earthquake. Two days later, the Jordan Football Association did the same.

Squads

Group stage
All times are local (UTC+3).

Group A

Group B

Goalscorers

References

Turkish Women's Cup
Turkish Women's Cup
Turkish Women's Cup
Turkish Women's Cup
Turkish